The Counterfeiters or Counterfeiters may refer to:

 The Counterfeiters (novel), a 1925 novel by André Gide
 Counterfeiters (1940 film), a German film
 The Counterfeiters (1948 film)
 The Counterfeiters (2007 film), a 2007 film written and directed by Stefan Ruzowitzky
 The Counterfeiters (2010 film), a 2010 film based on the Gide novel
 Counterfeiters (2017 film), a 2017 film written, directed by, and starring Bryce Hirschberg

See also 
 Counterfeit (disambiguation)